Caoya is a station on the Red line of Kaohsiung MRT in Cianjhen District, Kaohsiung, Taiwan.

The station is a two-level, underground station with an island platform and four exits. It is 210 metres long and is located at the intersection of Cueiheng South Rd. and Jhong-an Rd.

Around the station
 Fisheries Agency
 Kaohsiung Museum of Fisheries Civilization
 Taroko Park
 Fogong old village in Cianjhen
 Caoya Depot, TRA Kaohsiung Port Line

References

2008 establishments in Taiwan
Kaohsiung Metro Red line stations
Railway stations opened in 2008